Harriet Sena Siaw-Boateng is currently the Ambassador-designate to Belgium and Ghana’s Permanent Representative to The European Union. She was commissioned by President Nana Addo Dankwa Akufo-Addo on the February 1 2019. Harriet Boateng is a barrister and solicitor of the Supreme Court of Ghana.

Education 
Harriet Boateng had her  G.C.E. '0' Level education at Achimota, 1986. In 1988, she had her G.C.E. 'A' Level at OLA Secondary School. She has since furthered her education at the University of Ghana, Oxford University, UK and BPP Law School, England  studying B.A. (Hons) French And Linguistics, International Relations and Diplomatic Practice and Legal Practice respectively.  She finally obtained her certificate to practice law at the Ghana School of Law, 2016.

Career 
On the first of February 2019, Harriet Boateng was commissioned as the Ambassador-designate to Belgium and Ghana’s Permanent Representative to The European Union.

References

External links 
Harriet Sena Siaw-Boateng

Living people
Barristers and advocates
Solicitors
Place of birth missing (living people)
Year of birth missing (living people)
University of Ghana alumni
European Union officials
Ghanaian women ambassadors
Ambassadors of Ghana to Belgium
Alumni of Achimota School
Ghana School of Law alumni
OLA Girls Senior High School (Ho) alumni